Ayedaade/Isokan/Irewole Federal constituency is a National Assembly delegation in Osun State, Nigeria. It has been represented by Patricia Etteh, the former speaker of the House of Representatives, since 2007. 

As at 2020, there is one senator representing Ayedaade/Irewole/Isokan in the Senate (Upper House), in person of  Hon Adelere Oriolowo. The Senate scrutinizes proposed laws and the budget of the country, and provide oversight of its other decision-making bodies. This senatorial seat was keenly contested  in 2017 bye elections after the death late Senator Isiaka Adeleke. Senator Ademola Adeleke (brother of the deceased senator) defeated a former senator, Mudashiru Hussein of the APC, by a total of 97,480 votes to 66, 116 votes.

Also, one Representative represents Ayedaade/Irewole/Isokan in the Federal House of Representatives (Lower House), in person of Hon. Taiwo Olukemi Oluga. The House of Representatives is responsible for making laws in the country and for overall scrutiny of all aspects of government. Both representatives are from the All Progressives Congress, probably a trend that continued since former Hon. Patricia Etteh defected to the same party in 2018.

The elections in this constituency, like most Nigerian elections, are fraught with electoral malpractices. For example, the Guardian Newspaper reported that 2,411 voters engaged in multiple registrations. The investigators also found out that 2,402 voters registered twice while nine voters registered thrice. These fraudulent activities spanned nine local government areas including Atakunmosa West, Ayedaade, Ede North, Ilesa East, Ife North, Oriade, Ede South, Olorunda and Ife Central. 

Allocations to Local Government Areas in Ayedaade/Isokan/Irewole Federal Constituencies

Sometimes the fierce political battles center around the Federal Government monthly allocations to these local governments. as shown in Table 1 below.

References

Constituencies of the House of Representatives (Nigeria)